Capel Brunker (19 December 1898 – 25 June 1988) was a British equestrian. He competed at the 1924 Summer Olympics and the 1936 Summer Olympics.

References

External links
 

1898 births
1988 deaths
British male equestrians
Olympic equestrians of Great Britain
Equestrians at the 1924 Summer Olympics
Equestrians at the 1936 Summer Olympics
People from New Amsterdam, Guyana